The 1986 World Figure Skating Championships were held in Geneva, Switzerland from March 18 to 23. At the event, sanctioned by the International Skating Union, medals were awarded in men's singles, ladies' singles, pair skating, and ice dancing.

The ISU Representative was Josef Dědič (Czechoslovakia), and the ISU Technical Delegate was Elemér Terták (Hungary).

Soviet judge Natalia Danilenko was suspended for ignoring a new rule requiring mandatory deductions of 0.1 for falls; she gave Alexandr Fadeev a score of 5.9 after he fell twice, instead of a maximum of 5.8.

Medal tables

Medalists

Medals by country

Results

Men

Referee:
 Sonia Bianchetti 

Assistant Referee:
 Walburga Grimm 

Judges:
 Tatiana Danilenko 
 Maria Zuchowicz 
 Claire Ferguson 
 Jean Matthews 
 Björn Elwin 
 Junko Hiramatsu 
 Radovan Lipovšćak 
 Christiane Mörth 
 Miranda Marchi 

Substitute judge:
 Josette Betsch

Ladies

Referee:
 Benjamin T. Wright 

Assistant Referee:
 Erika Schiechtl 

Judges:
 Elfriede Beyer 
 Jacqueline Itschner 
 Charles U. Foster 
 Tjaša Andrée 
 Reinhard Mirmseker 
 Alexander Vedenin 
 Alexander Penchev 
 Leena Vainio 
 Franco Benini 

Substitute judge:
 Monique Georgelin

Pairs

Referee:
 Donald H. Gilchrist 

Assistant Referee:
 Markus Germann 

Judges:
 Shirley Taylor 
 Monique Georgelin 
 Eva von Gamm 
 Gerhardt Bubnik 
 Mikhail Drei 
 E. Newbold Black IV 
 Ralph S. McCreath 
 Geoffrey Yates 
 Günter Teichmann 

Substitute judge:
 Franco Benini

Ice dancing
*: Semi-final

Referee:
 Hans Kutschera 

Assistant Referee:
 Roland Wehinger 

Judges:
 Mary Parry 
 Judit Fürst 
 Kazuo Ohashi 
 Mary Louise Wright 
 Lily Klapp 
 Irina Absaliamova 
 William McLachlan 
 Lysiane Lauret 
 Gerhard Frey 

Substitute judge:
 Heide Maritczak

References

External links
 Result list provided by the ISU
 Debi Thomas Wins World Skating Title; Chin Takes Third
 Figure Skating : Two Soviet Teen-Agers Win Pairs

World Figure Skating Championships
World Figure Skating Championships
World Figure Skating Championships
International figure skating competitions hosted by Switzerland
World Figure Skating Championships
Sports competitions in Geneva
20th century in Geneva